HMCS Nipigon was a  that served in the Royal Canadian Navy during the Second World War. She saw action in the Battle of the Atlantic and the Battle of the St. Lawrence. She was named for Nipigon, Ontario. After the war she was sold to Turkey and renamed Bafra. She served as such from 1957 until 1972.

Design and description
They came in two versions powered by different engines; those with a diesel engines and those with vertical triple-expansion steam engines. Nipigon was of the latter design and was larger than her diesel-engined cousins. She had a complement of 6 officers and 77 enlisted.

Nipigon had two vertical triple-expansion steam engines, each driving one shaft, using steam provided by two Admiralty three-drum boilers.

Nipigon was armed with a single quick-firing (QF) /40 caliber Mk IV gun mounted forward. For anti-aircraft purposes, the minesweeper was equipped with one QF 2-pounder Mark VIII and two single-mounted QF 20 mm Oerlikon guns. As a convoy escort, Chedabucto was deployed with 40 depth charges.

Service history
Nipigon was ordered as part of the 1939–1940 building programme. The minesweeper's keel was laid down on 4 July 1940 by Dufferin Shipbuilding Co. at Toronto and the ship was launched on 1 October later that year. She was commissioned into the Royal Canadian Navy on 11 August 1941 at Toronto with the pennant number J154.

After commissioning, Nipigon was assigned to Sydney Force beginning in October 1941. She remained with this unit until 17 January 1942. She then spent periods of service with the Western Local Escort Force (WLEF), Halifax Force and Newfoundland Force. In June 1943, when WLEF divided its escorts into groups, the ship was assigned to EG W-1 as a convoy escort.

In early 1944, Nipigon underwent a refit, beginning at Lunenburg and completed at Liverpool. After completing workups, she was assigned to Halifax Force again until it was disbanded in 1945. She then performed various duties along the Atlantic coast until paid off at Sydney on 13 October 1945. She was laid up at Shelburne, Nova Scotia.

Following the war, Nipigon was placed in strategic reserve at Sorel, Quebec in 1946. She was reacquired by the Royal Canadian Navy in 1952 and refitted in preparation for active duty. The minesweeper was given the new pennant number 188, however she was never recommissioned. In 1953, Nipigon was re-rated as a coastal escort. She was sold to the Turkish Naval Forces on 29 November 1957 and renamed Bafra. The vessel sailed to Turkey on 19 May 1958. She served until 1972 when her registry was deleted. The ship was broken up in Turkey in 1972.

See also
List of ships of the Canadian Navy

References

Notes

Citations

Sources

External links
 Haze Gray and Underway
 ReadyAyeReady.com

 

Bangor-class minesweepers of the Royal Canadian Navy
Ships built in Ontario
1940 ships
World War II minesweepers of Canada